Oswald Haerdtl (17 May 1899 – 9 August 1959) was an Austrian architect. His work was part of the architecture event in the art competition at the 1936 Summer Olympics.

References

1899 births
1959 deaths
20th-century Austrian architects
Olympic competitors in art competitions
Architects from Vienna